To Mother may refer to:
 To Mother (EP), a 1991 EP by Babes in Toyland
 To Mother (g.o.d song), 1999
 To Mother (Yui song), 2010